Justice Rodriguez may refer to:

Ariel A. Rodriguez (1947–2017), acting associate justice of the New Jersey Supreme Court
Eduardo Rodríguez Veltzé (born 1956), chief justice of the Supreme Court of Bolivia
Maite Oronoz Rodríguez (born 1976), chief justice of the Supreme Court of Puerto Rico
Xavier Rodriguez (born 1961), associate justice of the Texas Supreme Court